Ümmü Kiraz (born September 27, 1982, in Acıpayam, Denizli Province, Turkey) is a Turkish female long-distance runner, who specializes in the marathon. She was a member of Denizli Belediyespor before she transferred to Kasımpaşaspor in Istanbul, where Kiraz is coached by Öznur Hatipoğlu.

At the 2012 Adana Half Marathon, Kiraz came second behind Bahar Doğan. She finished the 2012 Tarsus Half Marathon in third place.

Ümmü Kiraz qualified for participation in the marathon event at the 2012 Olympics in London, where she finished in 89th place.

In half marathon event of 2013 Mediterranean Games in Mersin, she finished at the third place (1:16:51) 

In 2015 she was banned for 2  years for 2011 biological passport irregularities.

Personal bests
According to All-Athletics and IAAF records, her best times as of April 2015 are:
1500 m 4:44.85 - Ankara (TUR), 20.05.2006
3000 m 10:28.48 - Ankara (TUR), 21.05.2006
10,000 m 33:10.85 - Skopje (MKD), 07.06.2014
15 km road 54:42 - Istanbul (TUR), 28.10.2007
Half marathon 1:12:19 - Tarsus, Mersin (TUR), 25.03.2012
Marathon 2:32:52 - Istanbul (TUR), 16.11.2014

References

1982 births
Living people
Turkish female long-distance runners
Turkish female marathon runners
People from Acıpayam
Olympic athletes of Turkey
Athletes (track and field) at the 2012 Summer Olympics
Doping cases in athletics
Turkish sportspeople in doping cases
Mediterranean Games bronze medalists for Turkey
Athletes (track and field) at the 2013 Mediterranean Games
Mediterranean Games medalists in athletics